Diego Aventín (born 21 September 1980 in Morón, Buenos Aires) is an Argentine racing driver. He has run in different series, with major success in Turismo Carretera, TC 2000 and TRV6. He is the son of former driver Oscar Aventín.

Career 
1995: Super Turismo 3000.
1996: Gran Turismo Internacional.
1997: Gran Turismo Internacional Champion.
1998: TC Pista, TRV6.
1999: Turismo Carretera, Gran Turismo Americano
2001: Turismo Carretera, Gran Turismo Americano Champion.
2002: Turismo Carretera, TRV6 Champion.
2004: TC2000, Turismo Carretera.
2005: TC2000, Turismo Carretera.
2006: TC2000, Turismo Carretera.
2007: Turismo Carretera, TRV6.
2008: Turismo Carretera, TRV6.
2009: Turismo Carretera, TRV6.
2010: Turismo Carretera, TRV6.
2011: Turismo Carretera, TRV6.
2012: Turismo Carretera, TRV6.
2013: Turismo Carretera Champion.
2014: Turismo Carretera.

External links
Official site 

1980 births
People from Morón Partido
Argentine racing drivers
TC 2000 Championship drivers
Turismo Carretera drivers
Top Race V6 drivers
Living people
Stock Car Brasil drivers
Sportspeople from Buenos Aires Province